Susan P. Fisher-Hoch (born 1940) is a British-born infectious-disease specialist who has made major contributions to the understanding of Legionnaires' disease and Lassa fever. She is the co-author, along with her husband Joseph B. McCormick, of the memoir Level 4: Virus Hunters of the CDC. Fisher-Hoch is professor of epidemiology at The University of Texas Health Science Center School of Public Health. She was inducted into the Women in Technology International Hall of Fame in 2008.

In 1993, Susan and her husband moved to Karachi, Pakistan, where they worked at the Aga Khan University. During her time there, she supervised the clinical microbiology laboratory which was the largest in Pakistan.

References

1940 births
Living people
Academic staff of Aga Khan University
British women epidemiologists
British expatriates in Pakistan
University of Texas Health Science Center at Houston faculty
British expatriates in the United States